The 1998 Sandwell Metropolitan Borough Council election took place on 7 May 1998 to elect members of Sandwell Metropolitan Borough Council in the West Midlands, England. One third of the council was up for election and the Labour party stayed in overall control of the council.

After the election, the composition of the council was
Labour 60
Liberal Democrat 9
Conservative 2
Independent 1

Campaign
Before the election Labour held 60 of the 72 seats, with the main opposition provided by the Liberal Democrats. 24 seats were contested in the election, including 20 Labour, 3 Liberal Democrat and 1 Conservative seats. These included the Liberal Democrat group leader, Sadie Smith, in Great Barr and the Conservative group leader, Bill Archer, in Wednesbury North.

Election result
The results saw no changes in party control, meaning that Labour continued to run the council.

References

1998 English local elections
1998
1990s in the West Midlands (county)